Lyubets is a rural locality (a selo) in Novoselskoye Rural Settlement, Kovrovsky District, Vladimir Oblast, Russia. The population was 14 as of 2010.

Geography 
Lyubets is located on the right bank of the Klyazma River, 11 km southwest of Kovrov (the district's administrative centre) by road. Pogost is the nearest rural locality.

References 

Rural localities in Kovrovsky District